The 2023 Oldham Metropolitan Borough Council elections are scheduled to take place on 4 May 2023 alongside other local elections across the United Kingdom. Due to boundary changes all 60 seats on Oldham Metropolitan Borough Council are to be contested.

Background

History 
The Local Government Act 1972 created a two-tier system of metropolitan counties and districts covering Greater Manchester, Merseyside, South Yorkshire, Tyne and Wear, the West Midlands, and West Yorkshire starting in 1974. Oldham was a district of the Greater Manchester metropolitan county. The Local Government Act 1985 abolished the metropolitan counties, with metropolitan districts taking on most of their powers as metropolitan boroughs. The Greater Manchester Combined Authority was created in 2011 and began electing the mayor of Greater Manchester from 2017, which was given strategic powers covering a region coterminous with the former Greater Manchester metropolitan county.

Since its formation, Oldham Council has typically been under Labour control or no overall control, with a period of Conservative control from 1978–1980 and Liberal Democrat control from 2000–2002. Labour most recently gained overall control of the council in the 2011 election.

In July 2022 the Local Government Boundary Commission for England made The Oldham (Electoral Changes) Order 2022, which officially abolished all 20 existing wards and established 20 new wards with new boundaries. Because of this change all 60 seats on the council, three per ward, are being contested.

Electoral process 
The election will take place using the plurality block voting system, a form of first-past-the-post voting, with each ward being represented by three councillors. The candidate with the most votes in each ward will serve a four year term ending in 2027, the second-placed candidate will serve a three year term anding in 2026 and the third-placed candidate will serve a one year term ending in 2024.

All registered electors (British, Irish, Commonwealth and European Union citizens) living in Oldham aged 18 or over will be entitled to vote in the election. People who live at two addresses in different councils, such as university students with different term-time and holiday addresses, are entitled to be registered for and vote in elections in both local authorities. Voting in-person at polling stations will take place from 07:00 to 22:00 on election day, and voters will be able to apply for postal votes or proxy votes in advance of the election.

Candidates 

Asterisks denote incumbent councillors seeking re-election.

Alexandra

Chadderton Central

Chadderton North

Chadderton South

Coldhurst

Crompton

Failsworth East

Failsworth West

Hollinwood

Medlock Vale

Royton North

Royton South

Saddleworth North

Saddleworth South

Saddleworth West and Lees

Shaw

St James'

St Mary's

Waterhead

Werneth

References 

Oldham Council elections
Oldham